The Trouble Shooter is a 1924 American silent Western film directed by Jack Conway and starring Tom Mix and Kathleen Key.

Plot
As described in a film magazine review, Tom Steele, chief electrician for the Ajax Power Company, goes to register a section of land just thrown open for occupancy by the Government, the ownership of which is to be claimed by the first to stake it off. He falls in love with Nancy Brewster, the  daughter of the rival company's president. Francis Earle, an unsuccessful suitor for Nancy's hand, plots to obtain the land for himself. After many adventures and with help of Nancy, whom he rescues from a storm in the mountains, Tom defeats his enemies and wins the love of Nancy.

Cast

Preservation
A print of The Trouble Shooter is preserved in a European film archive.

See also
 Tom Mix filmography

References

External links

 
 

1924 films
American black-and-white films
Fox Film films
1924 Western (genre) films
Films directed by Jack Conway
Silent American Western (genre) films
1920s American films
1920s English-language films